Love Station is a 2019 Nepalese drama romance film directed by Ujwal Ghimire. The film is produced by Gobinda Shahi, Krishu Shahi, and Kabir Bikram Shahi under the banner of Kafiya Films. The film stars Pradeep Khadka, and Jassita Gurung in the lead roles alongside Ramesh Budhathoki, Siru Bista, Rabi Dangol and Priya Rizal in the supporting roles. The film is scheduled to release on 5 April 2019.

Plot 

A Nepalese boy love a girl and they break up and get together at the end of the movie. A girl named rani (Jassita Gurung) will be kidnapped by a boy named Sagar (Pradeep Khadka). But later on after 22 years a guy named Arjun and Rani's father forcefully made rani to marry Arjun but she falls in love with her childhood kidnapper Sagar, Arjun also had an extra marital affair with other girl. Sagar was just a child when he kidnapped Rani, Sagar's father made him do kidnap rani because Sagar's mother died due to excessive bleeding during the baby delivery. After Rani gets to know about the extra marital affair of Arjun she was in shock and Sagar will help her to forget that idiot from her mind by just just being in front of her, Sagar will change the life of Rani. After that she finds that Arjun is in her home and Arjun still wanted Rani to marry him, Arjun also meets Sagar and gives him warning by throwing a knife to him which made Sagar to leave that place and shift in a flat in front of Rani's home Rani starts to get closer to her childhood kidnapper. After a party Sagar notices a birthmark on Rani's chest and he remembers that he had kidnapped her Sagar tries to see the birthmark but Rani's cloth in the chest got teared mistakenly and she starts to hate Sagar and her father forcefully makes her to marry Arjun but in the middle of the marriage Arjun's girlfriend meets him secretly and rani's friend tells her everything and Sagar takes her away from that place in that home where she was born and her own mother gives her food but that time they will not know that they are mother daughter but while Rani saw her baby photo in that room she notices a small birthmark on her chest which reveals that she has come to her real home and her real mother father. 

Sagar came her life as an angel and he made her return to her real mother father. Movie ends in emotional way

Cast 

 Pradeep Khadka
 Jassita Gurung
 Ramesh Budhathoki
 Siru Bista
 Rabi Dangol
 Priya Rizal

References

External links 

 

2010s Nepali-language films
Nepalese romantic drama films
2019 films
2019 romantic drama films